Herbert Koschel (9 December 1921 – 2 August 1980) was a German athlete. He competed in the men's javelin throw at the 1952 Summer Olympics and the 1956 Summer Olympics.

References

1921 births
1980 deaths
Athletes (track and field) at the 1952 Summer Olympics
Athletes (track and field) at the 1956 Summer Olympics
German male javelin throwers
Olympic athletes of Germany
Olympic athletes of the United Team of Germany
People from Bolesławiec